Eutropis vertebralis is a species of skink found in India. It is distinguishable by its white stripes with black edges, as well as by lacking a transparent disc on its lower eyelid.

References

Eutropis
Reptiles described in 1887
Reptiles of India
Endemic fauna of India
Taxa named by George Albert Boulenger